Malvern Link railway station serves Malvern Link in Worcestershire, England. It is one of two stations serving the town of Malvern, the other being Great Malvern station.

History
A six-mile railway from Henwick to Malvern Link opened in July 1859; in May 1860 the line was extended onward to Great Malvern and Malvern Wells.

Most of the original station buildings (on the down (eastern) side) had to be demolished in the 1960s after falling into poor repair, though the station house has survived.

Development
A set of improvements, funded by Worcestershire County Council, Network Rail and the Railway Heritage Trust, was carried out in 2014 to replace the wooden 1960s station building and provide a new entrance to the up platform from Osborne Road. In 2015 these improvements were awarded the Malvern Civic Society's Civic Award.

Services
The station is located on the Cotswold Line and served by West Midlands Railway and Great Western Railway.

References

Further reading

External links

Railway stations in Worcestershire
DfT Category E stations
Former Great Western Railway stations
Railway stations in Great Britain opened in 1859
Railway stations served by Great Western Railway
Railway stations served by West Midlands Trains
Buildings and structures in Malvern, Worcestershire
1859 establishments in England